Union Grove is a city in Upshur County, Texas, United States. The population was 357 at the 2010 census.

Geography

Union Grove is located at  (32.583227, –94.909607).

Demographics

As of the census of 2000, there were 346 people, 120 households, and 89 families residing in the city. The population density was 361.1 people per square mile (139.2/km). There were 130 housing units at an average density of 135.7 per square mile (52.3/km). The racial makeup of the city was 93.93% White, 3.47% African American, 0.29% Native American, 1.45% from other races, and 0.87% from two or more races. Hispanic or Latino of any race were 2.02% of the population.

There were 120 households, out of which 36.7% had children under the age of 18 living with them, 59.2% were married couples living together, 9.2% had a female householder with no husband present, and 25.8% were non-families. 19.2% of all households were made up of individuals, and 8.3% had someone living alone who was 65 years of age or older. The average household size was 2.88 and the average family size was 3.35.

In the city, the population was spread out, with 32.7% under the age of 18, 9.0% from 18 to 24, 28.9% from 25 to 44, 20.8% from 45 to 64, and 8.7% who were 65 years of age or older. The median age was 34 years. For every 100 females, there were 96.6 males. For every 100 females age 18 and over, there were 86.4 males.

The median income for a household in the city was $38,750, and the median income for a family was $48,750. Males had a median income of $40,313 versus $25,000 for females. The per capita income for the city was $14,444. About 23.8% of families and 24.3% of the population were below the poverty line, including 35.8% of those under age 18 and 17.4% of those age 65 or over.

Education
The City of Union Grove is served by the Union Grove Independent School District.

References

Cities in Upshur County, Texas
Cities in Texas
Longview metropolitan area, Texas